The Ying On Labor & Merchant Association or simply Ying On Association is a historical Chinese American association that was established in the 1930s for the purpose of assisting members of the Chinese community when they were threatened by unfair and discriminatory business practices; for organizing social gathering places for the Chinese; and at times, for organizing funeral parlors for the dead who had no kin or family in America. It also served as a boarding house for single Chinese men upon arrival to Tucson, Arizona and a fraternal organization for elderly Chinese men.

The Ying On Association still exists today.

Branches 
The Ying On Association has several branches in the United States including in:
 Bakersfield, California - 2110 L Street Google Street View
 Fresno, California - 1147 F Street Google Street View
 Las Vegas, Nevada - 5595 Spring Mountain Road Google Street View
 Los Angeles, California - 426 Bernard Street Google Street View
 Oakland, California - 712 Webster Street Google Street View
 Phoenix, Arizona - 2232 N 16th Street Google Street View
 San Diego, California - 502 3rd Avenue Google Street View
 San Francisco, California - 745 Grant Avenue Google Street View
 Tucson, Arizona - 1935 S 6th Avenue Google Street View

References

External links 
 History of the Ying On Association (in Traditional Chinese) 
 History of Chinese Associations in Fresno (in Simplified Chinese)

Tongs (organizations)
Organizations based in California